John Gerald Tungamirai Takwara (born 29 October 1994) is a Zimbabwean professional footballer who plays as a defensive midfielder for the Saudi Arabian club Ohod and the Zimbabwe national team.

Career
Takwara began his career in his native Zimbabwe with Tsholotsho Pirates and F.C. Platinum, before moving to South Africa with Ajax Cape Town. He moved back to Zimbabwe with Ngezi Platinum, before returning to South Africa with Venda on 22 July 2021.

On 19 July 2022, Takwara joined Saudi Arabian club Ohod.

International career
Takwara made his international debut with the Zimbabwe national team in a 0–0 2016 African Nations Championship tie with Comoros on 4 July 2015. He was part of the Zimbabwe squad the 2021 Africa Cup of Nations.

Honours
F.C. Platinum
Zimbabwe Premier Soccer League: 2017

References

External links
 
 

1994 births
Living people
Sportspeople from Harare
Zimbabwean footballers
Zimbabwe international footballers
Zimbabwe Premier Soccer League players
South African Premier Division players
Saudi First Division League players
Cape Town Spurs F.C. players
Ohod Club players
Association football midfielders
2021 Africa Cup of Nations players
Zimbabwean expatriate footballers
Zimbabwean expatriates in South Africa
Expatriate soccer players in South Africa
Zimbabwean expatriate sportspeople in Saudi Arabia
Expatriate footballers in Saudi Arabia
Zimbabwe A' international footballers
2016 African Nations Championship players